Wadeson is a surname. Notable people with the surname include:

Harriet Wadeson (1931–2016), American psychotherapist, author, researcher, and educator
Richard Wadeson (1826–1885), British soldier

Surnames of English origin